Gregory Stephen Smith (born January 8, 1991) is an American professional basketball player for the Mineros de Zacatecas of the Liga Nacional de Baloncesto Profesional (LNBP). He played college basketball for Fresno State before playing in the NBA and overseas.

High school career
Smith attended Edison High School in Fresno, California from 2005 to 2008. As a junior in 2007–08, he averaged 22 points, 15 rebounds, five assists and five blocks per game. In 2008, he transferred to Westwind Preparatory Academy in Phoenix, Arizona where as a senior in 2008–09, he earned All-Arizona State honors and was nominated for the McDonald's All-America Team after he averaged 26 points, 14.4 rebounds, six blocks, four assists and three steals per game.

College career
In his freshman season at Fresno State, Smith was named the 2009–10 WAC Freshman of the Year and earned Freshman All-American honors by CollegeInsider.com. In 33 games (all starts), he averaged 11.5 points, 5.8 rebounds, 1.2 assists and 1.2 blocks in 27.7 minutes per game.

In his sophomore season, Smith earned second-team All-WAC honors. In 31 games, he averaged 11.7 points, 8.1 rebounds, 1.7 assists, 1.1 steals and 1.1 blocks in 30.4 minutes per game.

In March 2011, Smith declared for the NBA draft, forgoing his final two years of college eligibility.

Professional career

Soles de Mexicali (2011)
After going undrafted in the 2011 NBA draft, and with the NBA lockout affecting players from signing with teams or playing in the summer league, Smith joined Soles de Mexicali of the Liga Nacional de Baloncesto Profesional (LNBP) in August 2011. In his first professional game, Smith scored 18 points and grabbed 9 rebounds in a 107-72 win over the Aguilas Rojas. He appeared in 27 games for Soles before leaving the club in late November to return to the United States in the wake of the NBA lockout concluding.

Houston Rockets / Rio Grande Valley Vipers (2011–2014)
On December 13, 2011, Smith signed with the Houston Rockets. However, he was later waived by the Rockets on December 22, 2011 after appearing in two preseason games. On December 28, he was acquired by the Rio Grande Valley Vipers as an affiliate player.

On February 8, 2012, Smith re-signed with the Rockets to a multi-year deal. The next day, he was assigned back down to the Vipers. He was later recalled by the Rockets on February 18, reassigned on March 21 and recalled again on April 8 following the conclusion of the Vipers' season. Having played mostly for the Vipers in his rookie season, Smith was named to the All-NBA D-League first team and the All-Rookie first team.

In July 2012, Smith joined the Rockets for the 2012 NBA Summer League. On February 10, 2013, he was reassigned to the Vipers. Four days later, he was recalled by the Rockets. On March 30, 2013, Smith received his first career start. In 30 minutes of action, he recorded 9 points and 8 rebounds in a 98–81 win over the Los Angeles Clippers. He subsequently remained in the starting lineup for the remainder of the regular season. He went on to start the first game of the Rockets' first round playoff match-up against the Oklahoma City Thunder, but moved back to a bench role for game two following a large Game 1 loss.

In July 2013, Smith re-joined the Rockets for the 2013 NBA Summer League. On November 14, 2013, he injured his right knee during a game against the New York Knicks which resulted in Smith being helped from the floor and missing a month of action. On December 15, he returned to the line-up. However, he re-injured his knee a month later and was sidelined indefinitely. On April 10, 2014, he was waived by the Rockets.

Chicago Bulls / Dallas Mavericks (2014–2015)
On April 14, 2014, Smith signed with the Chicago Bulls for the rest of the 2013–14 season. However, still suffering from the knee injury he sustained in January, Smith did not appear in a game for the Bulls in 2013–14, missing the team's final two regular season games and all five playoff games against the Washington Wizards.

On July 14, 2014, Smith was traded to the Dallas Mavericks in exchange for the rights to Tadija Dragićević. He became a free agent in the summer of 2015.

Raptors 905 (2016)
On January 5, 2016, Smith was acquired by Raptors 905 of the NBA Development League. He made his debut for the team two days later, recording 15 points, 3 rebounds, 6 assists, 1 steal and 1 block as a starter in a 102–98 loss to the Sioux Falls Skyforce.

Minnesota Timberwolves (2016)
On March 2, 2016, Smith signed a 10-day contract with the Minnesota Timberwolves. He made his debut for the Timberwolves later that night in a 104–98 loss to the Washington Wizards, recording four points, one rebound and one assist in 10 minutes off the bench. He later signed a second 10-day contract with the Timberwolves on March 12, and a rest-of-season contract on March 23. On June 30, 2016, he was waived by the Timberwolves.

İstanbul BŞB (2016)
On October 7, 2016, Smith signed with İstanbul BŞB of the Turkish League. He appeared in seven games for İstanbul before parting ways with the team in late November.

Blackwater Elite (2017)
On March 4, 2017, Smith signed with Blackwater Elite as an import for the 2017 PBA Commissioner's Cup. In his PBA debut, Smith scored 37 points and grabbed a career-high 30 rebounds in a 116-118 2OT loss to the Phoenix Fuel Masters. In 10 games, he averaged 27.7 points, 21.2 rebounds, 5.1 assists, 1.2 steals and 1.0 blocks per game.

Osaka Evessa (2017)
On August 8, 2017, Smith signed with Osaka Evessa of the Japanese B.League. He left the team in December 2017. In 20 games, he averaged 9.1 points, 7.5 rebounds, 1.9 assists and 1.3 steals per game.

Taiwan and Puerto Rico (2018–2019)
Between November and December 2018, Smith played in Taiwan for Bank of Taiwan, where he averaged 14.3 points, 13.5 rebounds, 3.7 assists, 1.7 steals, and 1.2 blocks, in 15 games. In March 2019, he joined Puerto Rican team Vaqueros de Bayamón.

Return to Blackwater Elite (2019)
On July 15, 2019, Smith signed with Blackwater Elite, returning to the team for a second stint ahead of the 2019 PBA Commissioner's Cup playoffs. In Game 2 of the Commissioner's Cup Playoffs, Smith recorded 31 points and 18 rebounds to force a do-or-die Game 3 against Rain or Shine.

Mineros de Zacatecas (2019–present)
On July 12, 2019, Smith signed with the Mineros de Zacatecas for the 2019–20 LNBP season.

NBA career statistics

Regular season

|-
| align="left" | 
| align="left" | Houston
| 8 || 0 || 8.6 || .636 || .000 || .000 || 2.5 || .1 || .2 || .6 || 1.8
|-
| align="left" | 
| align="left" | Houston
| 70 || 10 || 15.9 || .620 || .000 || .623 || 4.6 || .4 || .3 || .6 || 6.0
|-
| align="left" | 
| align="left" | Houston
| 11 || 0 || 9.1 || .643 || .000 || .400 || 2.5 || .0 || .1 || .2 || 3.5
|-
| align="left" | 
| align="left" | Dallas
| 42 || 2 || 8.6 || .612 || .000 || .513 || 1.9 || .2 || .2 || .3 || 1.9
|-
| align="left" | 
| align="left" | Minnesota
| 18 || 0 || 10.7 || .563 || .000 || .412 || 2.3 || .3 || .2 || .1 || 2.4
|-
|- class="sortbottom"
| style="text-align:left;"| Career
| style="text-align:left;"|
| 149 || 12 || 12.3 || .617 || .000 || .576 || 3.3 || .3 || .2 || .4 || 4.0

Playoffs

|-
| align="left" | 2013
| align="left" | Houston
| 5 || 1 || 11.8 || .667 || .000 || .500 || 2.6 || .0 || .4 || .4 || 3.6
|-
| align="left" | 2015
| align="left" | Dallas
| 1 || 0 || 1.0 || .000 || .000 || .000 || .0 || .0 || .0 || .0 || .0
|-
|- class="sortbottom"
| style="text-align:left;"| Career
| style="text-align:left;"|
| 6 || 1 || 10.0 || .667 || .000 || .500 || 2.2 || .0 || .3 || .3 || 3.0

Personal life
Smith is the son of Cheryl Duckworth and has an older sister, Ashely and a younger brother, Divante. His uncle, Steve Shelley, was a Fresno Statewide-receiver in 1988–89 who later signed with the San Diego Chargers in 1990.

References

External links

Greg Smith – Get To Know Him

1991 births
Living people
21st-century African-American sportspeople
African-American basketball players
American expatriate basketball people in Canada
American expatriate basketball people in Japan
American expatriate basketball people in Mexico
American expatriate basketball people in the Philippines
American expatriate basketball people in Taiwan
American expatriate basketball people in Turkey
American men's basketball players
Basketball players from California
Blackwater Bossing players
Centers (basketball)
Dallas Mavericks players
Fresno State Bulldogs men's basketball players
Houston Rockets players
İstanbul Büyükşehir Belediyespor basketball players
Mineros de Zacatecas (basketball) players
Minnesota Timberwolves players
Osaka Evessa players
Philippine Basketball Association imports
Power forwards (basketball)
Raptors 905 players
Rio Grande Valley Vipers players
Soles de Mexicali players
Sportspeople from Fresno, California
Undrafted National Basketball Association players
Bank of Taiwan basketball players
Super Basketball League imports